Rance is a role-playing video-game series created, developed, and published by AliceSoft. It is the longest-running erotic video game series in history, with nearly 30 years between the first game and the conclusion of the series. The first installment, Rance: The Quest for Hikari, was released in 1989, while the last main-series game, Rance X: Showdown, was released in 2018.

The Rance series follows the titular character, Rance, as he saves a number of kingdoms, defeats demon invaders, and causes mischief in the in-game world, "The Continent." He has appeared in most of the main series games as the playable character, accompanied by his loyal slave, Sill Plain. The main series has ten main games, with two spinoffs following the event of Rance IV, the original canon concluding with Kichikuou Rance (Brutal King Rance). In addition, the first three games, Rance: The Quest for Hikari, Rance II: The Rebellious Maidens, and Rance III: The Fall of Leazas were remade in the late 2000s and early 2010s, to better fit into the main canon.

Games

Rance: The Quest for Hikari
Rance, a mercenary with the Keith Guild, accepts a mission to find and rescue the daughter of a rich family. Rance travels to the kingdom of Leazas and investigates the castle town, while Sill investigates at the all-girls Paris Academy, where the kidnapped girl attended school. The first game made under the AliceSoft brand, it was released on the PC-8800 and PC-9800 series of computers, as well as the Sharp X68000, the MSX 2 and 2+, the FM TOWNS, and the PC88VA. A Windows 95–03 version of the game was released in the late 1990s, about eight years after the first game was released.

Rance 01: The Quest for Hikari
Rance 01: Quest for Hikari, released for Windows in 2013, has the same setting as Rance: The Quest for Hikari, and replaces the latter in the main canon. The game features an improved gameplay system, and introduces more new content compared to Rance 02, the remake of Rance II. The game was officially released in English by MangaGamer in 2020, bundled with Rance 02: The Rebellious Maidens.

Rance II: The Rebellious Maidens
The city of Kathtom, a member of the Free City Zone, is suddenly entombed underground by the Four Mages who were tasked to guard the town by Ragishss Cryhausen, the city's former guardian. Rance sets out with Sill to defeat them, but soon learns that their minds were corrupted by the power of the rings that they wield. Rance sets out to prevent them from receiving the magic power the rings grant. It was released in 1990 on the same computer systems as the first Rance game was.

Rance 02: The Rebellious Maidens
A graphical remake of Rance II: The Rebellious Maidens, released for Windows in 2009. It was the genesis for the other early Rance series re-releases. It did not contain as much new content as the next two re-releases, Rance 01: The Quest for Hikari and Rance 03: The Fall of Leazas. The later released Kai version includes the completely rewritten script to better fit the main canon. The game was officially released in English by MangaGamer in 2020, bundled with Rance 01: The Quest for Hikari.

Rance III: The Fall of Leazas
Leazas, a kingdom ruled by Queen Lia Parapara Leazas, is invaded by the warring empire of Helman, to the west. Demons, nigh-invulnerable monsters who drank the blood of the Demon King, are believed to be the cause of the attack, and to solve that problem, Rance sets out to find Chaos the Darksword, a weapon capable of breaking the Demons' invincibility field. It was released in 1991 on the PC-9800 series of computers, along with Sharp X68000 and the FM TOWNS; an early Windows release, similar to those that the first two Rance games received, was also released.

Rance 03: The Fall of Leazas
A complete reimagining of Rance III: The Fall of Leazas, released for Windows in 2015. The graphics are renewed, while the story is changed to better fit into the main canon. It is the most advanced of the early Rance re-releases.

Rance IV: The Legacy of the Sect
This game directly follows the events of Rance III. Rance, having defeated the Fiends of Helman and saved Leazas, is teleported to Ylapu, a giant floating island above Leazas. There, Rance must find a way to escape from the island, but is hindered by agents of Leazas and Helman who come to retrieve him to The Continent. The legacy alluded to by the game's title is a powerful magical artifact left by the Holy Magic Sect. It was released in 1993 for the PC-9800 series and the FM TOWNS.

Rance 4.1 ~ Save the Medicine Plant! ~
Rance accepts a quest to stop a horde of underground monsters from attacking the Happiness Pharmaceutical building, where Ibeprofun, a healing medicine, is produced. They discover that the perpetrators are the Angel Army; one of their commanders escapes, which begins the next game, Rance 4.2 ~ Angel Army ~.

Rance 4.2 ~ Angel Army ~
In a continuance of the previous game, Rance 4.1 ~ Save the Medicine Plant! ~, Rance chases down the remainder of the Angel Army, while himself being chased after by an assassination group and three "Rare Gal-Monsters," a class of unique enemies that he offended in Rance IV: The Legacy of the Sect. The two games were released in 1995 for the PC-9800 series, with a separate on-disc version.

Kichikuou Rance
The game was intended to a "What if..." conclusion of the Rance series for if AliceSoft were to go under before the series was to be completed, however, its great popularity allowed the company to continue its production of games. Rance, bored of his normal life, gathers a group of outlaw bandits and takes over some towns in southern Helman. The imperial army quickly puts down Rance's rebellion and take Sill captive; however, he escapes to Leazas, where he marries the country's queen to become a tyrant "brutal king," commanding his own army to seek his revenge on Helman. Large opposition forces arise tried to remove the tyrant ruler from power; yet, Rance continues his trials to re-assert his power as the King of Leazas, retrieve Sill from Helman control, and take over the world. Rance, in fulfilling his general role as an epic hero, saves The Continent from destruction by a greater evil. Released in 1996, it is the first grand strategy game in the Rance series, and was the basis for Sengoku Rance and other non-Rance titles by AliceSoft with similar gameplay. It was also the first AliceSoft game released primarily for Windows and all other Rance games would follow.

Rance 5D: The Lonely Girl
A soft reboot of the Rance series, released in 2002 after a 6-year hiatus following Brutal King Rance. Rance 5D: The Lonely Girl is based on a unique roulette system, where the role-playing elements are determined by randomization. In the game, Rance is traveling through the Continent, when he and Sill stumble upon Genbu Castle, a castle leading to another dimension. They must then escape the dimension, along with a new ally, Rizna Lanfbitt of Zeth. The game was officially released in English by MangaGamer in 2016, bundled with Rance VI: The Collapse of Zeth.

Rance VI: The Collapse of Zeth
Rance, continuing his trials from Rance 5D: The Lonely Girl, travels to Zeth, a kingdom to the south-west of Leazas. He offends Radon, a high governmental official, and is sent to a slave camp. Sill, despite having previously been sold to Rance from the Zethan slave trade, is treated very kindly. While within the slave camp, Rance joins the resistance group "Ice Flame," which seeks to change the inequality of Zethan society, in which non-magic users are treated as second-class citizens. Rance VI: The Collapse of Zeth, released in 2004, is one of the most well-received installments in the Rance series, primarily due to its borrowing of story elements from the non-canon Brutal King Rance. The game was officially translated by MangaGamer in 2016, bundled with Rance 5D: The Lonely Girl.

Sengoku Rance
Rance sets out for Nippon, an island archipelago to the east of the Continent, which is modeled after the Warring-States Period of Japanese history. The original English translation of this game, that of Yandere Translations, gave the Rance series, and AliceSoft in general, a noticeable presence in the western world. Sengoku Rance, also known as Rance VII, was one of AliceSoft's best-selling titles of all time. In the game, Rance, having been entrusted by an ill Oda Nobunaga to command the Oda clan in his place, seeks to take over Nippon and have sex with as many beautiful Nipponese women as he can. The game was released in Japan in 2006, and an official English translation by MangaGamer was released in 2019.

Rance Quest
Also known as Rance VIII, it directly follows the events of Sengoku Rance. Rance returns to the Continent to seek a cure for the curse that was placed on Sill by the Archfiend. While attempting to convince the Queen of Pencilcow, a kingdom to the west of Leazas, to cure Sill, he offends her, and she places a curse on him that he must become much stronger to overcome. He then journeys around the Continent, seeking a cure for both himself and for Sill. This installment focuses more on the individual stories of its various characters than on continuing the greater storyline of the series itself. The game was released in 2011, and an official English translation by MangaGamer was released in 2021

Rance Quest MAGNUM
An expansion of Rance Quest, this game follows Rance as he quests around the Continent to break the curse incurred upon himself in the previous game. The game focuses on the addition of sundry quests, through which Rance can adventure, ostensibly to cure his curse, although primarily in practice to assuage the effects of the curse. The expansion includes an alternate ending that segues into Rance IX, and was directly implemented into the official English release, without needing to be purchased separately.

Rance IX: The Helmanian Revolution
The government of Helman has fallen into the hands of Stessel Ignon, who corrupts the country and plans to take over the entirety of the Continent. A revolutionary force gathers, seeking to replace the former emperor to the throne, and they solicit the aid of Rance, who agrees, hoping to find a way to remove Sill's curse. The Prime Minister, Stessel, has been planning this, and his actions have been seen earlier in the Rance series; he pushed for the war between Helman and Leazas in the events of Rance III: The Fall of Leazas. The game was released in 2014, and an official English translation by MangaGamer is in progress, and on 25 January 2023 a release date of 23 February 2023 was announced.

Rance X: Showdown
The conclusion of the Rance series, it was released on 23 February 2018. The war amongst the Fiends of the Monster Realm has ended, and they now invade the human realm, to their east. Rance leads the combined forces of all humanity to battle the attacking Fiends. It is known to have the largest video game script ever written. An official English translation by MangaGamer is in progress, though a release date has not yet been confirmed.

Characters
The Rance series has featured a large number of characters throughout its installments. A number of characters are shown below.

Rance (ランス)
The main playable and the titular character of the Rance series. He is a powerful warrior who was created to the "kichiku" character archetype. He was based out of a town in the Free Cities Alliance, where he accepts jobs from Keith's Guild when he is low on money. He lives in the "Rance Castle," which he had built after the events of Rance Quest. The games generally feature quests and other missions that he embarks upon to gain or regain the money he has lost.

Sill Plain (シィル・プライン)
A powerful magic user that generally accompanies Rance on his quests. He bought her from a slave camp in Zeth, where she was born; she now must travel with him wherever he goes. She was frozen in ice at the end of Sengoku Rance and freed at the end of Rance IX: The Helmanian Revolution.

Athena 2.0 (あてな2号)
An organic-base android that functions as a pet to Rance. An accident during her creation caused her to have lower intelligence and an inability to gain a higher level. She was created in the events of Rance IV: The Legacy of the Sect. She is a noted magic user, although she is not as powerful as Sill due to her limitations.

Lia Parapara Leazas (リア・パラパラ・リーザス)
The Queen of Leazas, who married Rance in Brutal King Rance. She brought a new age of prosperity to the kingdom, which led to an antagonism brewed amongst a number of foreign countries and noblemen. She became the queen after her two brothers were killed in a succession dispute. She grants her handmaiden, Maris Amaryllis, a large amount of governing power, whilst regularly taking maidens by way of Kanami Kentou, a Nipponese ninja under her command. Her serial kidnapping was eventually thwarted by Rance.

Kanami Kentou (見当 かなみ)
A Nipponese ninja who was taken in by Queen Lia Leazas after she got lost on the Continent. She is generally engaged in assisting the queen in getting the affection of Rance, although she was used to gather maidens until the events of Rance: The Quest for Hikari.

Rizna Lanfbitt (リズナ・ランフビット)
A magic user, originally from Zeth; she is first encountered by Rance in the Genbu Castle dimension in Rance 5D: The Lonely Girl when he accidentally enters there. She is incredibly naïve, and that naïveté caused her a lot of pain while trapped in the alternate dimension; while a kind spirit helped her, it was Rance that enabled her to escape. She is now in the protection of the King of Zeth, a childhood friend of hers whom she knew before she was imprisoned.

Copandon Dott (コパンドン・ドット)
A noted businesswoman, who seeks to marry Rance in order to increase her luck. She was born as a miko, but after predicting her own future as one of great misfortune, became obsessed with luck and wealth; this caused her to strive towards business, where she succeeded. She is first encountered in Rance 5D: The Lonely Girl, while seeking a man who has great luck.

Urza Pranaice (ウルザ・プラナアイス)
The leader of the Zeth resistance group Ice Flame. She is introduced to Rance when he enters the Zeth slave camp in Rance VI: The Collapse of Zeth, and takes control of her resistance group. The game continues, Zeth is made more equal, and the resistance groups is disbanded. She becomes one of the Four Lords who guard Zeth, the first non-magic user to do so.

Crook Mofus (クルックー・モフス)
The Pope of the Church of Alice, the dominant religion on The Continent. She first appeared in Rance Quest as a bishop in the church; she became the Pope when the former one, Duran Teyuran, died. She has a great knowledge of curses, and helped free Sill from her curse at the end of Rance IX: The Helmanian Revolution.

Sachiko Centers (サチコ・センターズ)
She was saved by Rance whilst being attacked by monsters during the events of Rance Quest and made into his slave. She is a member of the Church of Alice, and is very respectful to Crook, the church's Pope. She is a very powerful guard in combat.

Patton Misnarge (パットン・ミスナルジ)
A former prince of Helman, who led the war against Leazas in the events of Rance III: The Fall of Leazas. He has a key role in Rance IX: The Helmanian Revolution, where Rance aids him in a large force seeking to take back the country from its current, corrupt state.

OVA
A hentai OVA based upon the series, Rance: Sabaku no Guardian, was released on December 25, 1993. It was not directly related to the events of any game in the series. It consisted of two episodes.

A second original video animation series, Rance 01: Hikari wo Motomete The Animation, was an adaptation of the re-release of the first game, Rance 01: The Quest for Hikari, and was released from December 26, 2014 to June 24, 2016. Consisting of four episodes, the OVA was directed by Takashi Nishikawa and animated by studio Seven.

See also
AliceSoft

References
   7)Mushoku tensei was inspired by Rance 
https://animecorner.me/works-that-inspired-the-author-of-mushoku-tensei/

External links
Official website
The official AliceSoft web-site
"AliceSoft" at the Visual Novel Data-base

Video game franchises introduced in 1989
Eroge
NEC PC-8801 games
NEC PC-9801 games
Role-playing video games
X68000 games
Video games developed in Japan
Windows games